Alvi Haque (born 10 June 2002) is a Bangladeshi cricketer. He made his first-class debut on 9 November 2019, for Chittagong Division in the 2019–20 National Cricket League.

References

External links
 

2002 births
Living people
Bangladeshi cricketers
Chittagong Division cricketers
Place of birth missing (living people)